Confederate military officer Stonewall Jackson was wounded at the Battle of Chancellorsville on May 2, 1863, and his left arm was amputated by Dr. Hunter McGuire.  Chaplain Beverly Tucker Lacy had the arm buried at Ellwood Manor. Jackson died on May 10. Confederate staff officer James Power Smith had a granite monument erected for the gravesite of the arm in 1903, although it is not known how accurately Smith's marker represents the true location of the arm.  Legend holds that Smedley Butler had the arm exhumed in 1921, although the factual accuracy of this story is dubious.  While it is unknown where the arm is now located, or if it even still exists, the marker has become a tourist site.

Background

Thomas J. Jackson was born on January 21, 1824.  He attended West Point, and after graduating in 1846, served in the United States Army, including service in the Mexican-American War.  In 1852, he resigned from the army and began teaching at the Virginia Military Institute.  After the start of the American Civil War in 1861, Jackson was an officer in the Virginia militia and joined the Confederate States Army.  At the First Battle of Bull Run, he gained fame and the nickname of "Stonewall".  Serving as a high-ranking officer in the Army of Northern Virginia under Robert E. Lee, Jackson fought in a number of battles and became well-known.  On May 2, 1863, in the Battle of Chancellorsville, Jackson led his force on a successful flank attack against the Federal army. While scouting in front of his own lines the night after the flank attack, Jackson was shot in a friendly fire incident.  He was wounded in three places: one in the right hand and two in the left arm.  A few hours later, Dr. Hunter McGuire examined Jackson's wounds, and determined that his left arm needed amputation.  The arm was cut off below the shoulder, with Jackson having been sedated with chloroform.

Post-amputation history

While helping prepare the wounded Jackson to be moved from the battlefield for his safety, chaplain Beverly Tucker Lacy noticed Jackson's arm, wrapped up and intended to be buried in a ditch with other amputated limbs. Believing that the arm deserved a better fate, Lacy had the arm buried at Ellwood Manor (a home owned by Lacy's brother), in the family plot there. The general was not informed of the burial of the limb. Jackson died of pneumonia on May 10.  Jackson's widow was asked if she desired the exhumation of the arm so that it could be buried along with the general, but declined after being assured that the arm had received Christian burial.  The next year, on May 6, during the Battle of Wilderness, a Federal soldier reported in his diary that some of his fellow soldiers had exhumed the arm and then reburied it, although the location of the reburial is not known.  The first marker erected at the site was a granite one placed in 1903 by former Jackson staff officer James Power Smith. It is not known how exactly this marker locates the burial site of Jackson's arm.  It is known that other markers placed by Smith at battlefields are "quite approximate in nature".  The marker bears the words "Arm of Stonewall Jackson May 3, 1863".  Despite the cemetery containing the graves of 15 people, the only grave monument is the one for the arm.

In 1921, a force from the United States Marine Corps conducted a large mock battle at the Wilderness battlefield, led by Smedley Butler.  Among the visitors were President of the United States Warren G. Harding, and his wife, Florence Harding.  The Hardings stayed at Ellwood during their visit, and Florence was reported to have visited the burial site of Jackson's arm.  By the late 1930s, a story from the family who owned Ellwood had begun to circulate claiming that Butler had been told of and disbelieved the claim that Jackson's arm had been buried at the site, and ordered an excavation made by a squad of marines.  The tale claims that Butler and the marines found the remains of the arm and had it reburied in a metal container.  Further versions of the story have claimed that the arm received a 21-gun salute upon reburial.  One account claims that Butler filed a report about what had happened, but no such report has been located.  Family history also claims that Butler revisited the site long after the 1921 mock battle.

While the story about Butler's visit is repeated on a historical marker near the site, and has been often published, the factual accuracy of the legend is disputed.  Ellwood came under the control of the National Park Service (NPS), and the NPS conducted an archaeological study at the site.  The study found no evidence of disturbed earth around the marker, and NPS attempts to locate the metal container with a metal detector have failed to turn up such a container.  A 2010 NPS press release included the conclusion "the arm was never dug up. It certainly was not reburied in the box near the marker" and expressed a belief that the Butler story was false. The press release also noted the NPS had failed to find documentation supporting the story from before 1940.  A historian for the NPS has also rejected claims that the arm was stolen, or that it is located in storage somewhere.

A metal plaque reading "A Tribute to the Memory of Stonewall Jackson by the East Coast Expeditionary Force United States Marines. Sept. 26 - Oct. 4, 1921" was formerly affixed to the 1903 marker.  It is unknown when this plaque was affixed, although it has been claimed that it was added during the 1921 mock battle.  At an unknown date, the plaque either eroded off or was removed from the granite marker.  It has since been placed into storage.  Chris Mackowski, writing for Civil War Times questions why Butler would have had a marker prepared if he had not known about the arm before the 1921 exercise, but also wonders why it would have been installed on the marker if the site was dug up and found to be empty.

Mackowski writes that frequent digging in the park could have rendered the arm unlocatable, or that the arm could have completely disintegrated over time.  However, he does conclude that "In all likelihood, Stonewall Jackson's missing arm is still in the Ellwood family cemetery".  NPS historian Frank O'Reilly states he believes that Jackson's arm was indeed buried in the area, but that it either no longer exists or is buried at a lost location elsewhere in the cemetery.  The marker has become a tourist attraction.  Mackowski and historian Kristopher D. White have compared the monument for Jackson's arm to the Boot Monument for Benedict Arnold's injury at the Battle of Saratoga, the display of Santa Anna's prosthetic leg at a museum in Illinois, and the museum display of Daniel Sickles's leg.

References

Sources

Further reading
 Stonewall Jackson's Arm Lies Here - a 2012 article in The Atlantic reflecting on the symbolism of the arm monument as an example of military sacrifice

Stonewall Jackson
Body parts of individual people
Fredericksburg and Spotsylvania National Military Park
Amputations
Arm